– is Japanese musician, composer, arranger, pianist, who studied composition in Tokyo and Paris. Noted not only for his masterful piano, but also for his talent of composing and arranger of elegant and thrilling ensembles, based on the impressive depth and variety of his musical literacy. He has composed original soundtracks for Japanese TV series such as the NHK Taiga drama Yae no Sakura (nominated for the 42nd International Emmy Awards, Drama Series).

In recent years, he participated in Jane Birkin's world tours (Jane Birkin sings Serge Gainsbourg "Via Japan") as musical director, orchestrator and pianist (over 70 concerts in 27 countries) 2011-2013. Since 2016, he also joined her world tour "Gainsbourg Symphonique" as the orchestral arranger and pianist.

Discography

Studio albums
 ETE,Palma ~ a vague impression of the summer ~ (2006)
 PASSACAILLE  (2007)
 MELANCOLIA (2010)
 Cancellare (2012)
 clair-obscur (2014)
 Broken Blossoms (2015)

Original soundtrack albums
 The Fallen Angel  (Ningen Shikkaku)  (2010)
 Tamayura OVA  (2010)
 Tamayura ~ hitotose ~  (2011)
 Yae no Sakura I  (2013)
 Yae no Sakura II  (2013)
 Yae no Sakura III  (2013)
 Yae no Sakura complete edition  (2014)
 The Mourner  (2015)

Works as a Composer

Film
 The Fallen Angel  (dir. Genjiro Arato / 2010)
 The Mourner  (dir. Yukihiko Tsutsumi / 2015)
 good-bye  (dir. Toshihiro Hanyu / 2015)
 sinsin  (dir. Yu Yamanaka / 2020)

Drama
 Yae's Sakura  (Yae no Sakura)  (NHK Taiga Drama / 2013), 42nd International Emmy Awards Nominee, Drama Series
 Kamisama no Boat  (dir. Takashi Minamoto / NHK-BS / 2013)
 Inemuri Sensei  (dir. Takashi Minamoto  / TV Asahi / 2013)
 Liquid: Oni no Sake, Kiseki no Kura  (dir. Takashi Minamoto / NHK-BS / 2015)
 Beautiful Slow Life  (dir. Takashi Minamoto / NHK / 2015)
 Godan  (WOWOW / 2015)
 Tokyo Trial （NHK / Netflix / 2016年） Series Music

Animated film
 Tamayura  (dir. Junichi Sato / 2010~2016)

TV program
 Tabi no Chikara Theme music  (NHK-BS Documentary / 2011)
 Musée d'Orsay （NHK-8K / 2020）

Works as an arranger
 Jane Birkin : Jane Birkin sings Serge Gainsbourg “VIA JAPAN” 2011-2013（Arrangement / Piano）
 Jane Birkin : Birkin Gainsbourg - le symphonique 2016~ （Orchestral Arrangement / Piano）
 Jane Birkin : Gainsbourg Symphonie Intime 2018~ （Arrangement / Piano）
 PIAF SYMPHONIQUE 2019~ （Orchestral Arrangement / Piano）
 Alain Chamfort : DANDY SYMPHONIQUE 2020~ （Orchestral Arrangement / Piano）

Other works

Compilation
 " Ibiza Sundowner Presented By José Padilla "  (2012) Thinking of You  (NN's Dreamy Mix)

Collaboration
 " une petite fille " Jane Birkin + Nobuyuki Nakajima  (2012)

External links
 Nobuyuki NAKAJIMA official site
 Nobuyuki NAKAJIMA facebook page
 Nobuyuki NAKAJIMA instagram
 Nobuyuki NAKAJIMA Spotify

1969 births
20th-century classical composers
20th-century classical pianists
20th-century Japanese male musicians
21st-century classical composers
21st-century classical pianists
21st-century Japanese male musicians
Japanese classical composers
Japanese classical pianists
Japanese film score composers
Japanese male classical composers
Japanese male classical pianists
Japanese male film score composers
Living people
Musicians from Tokyo